Son View Point, also known as Eco Point Robertsganj, is an Eco Garden in Sonbhadra district, India.
The panoramic view of Son Valley is best witnessed from this point. It is about 6 km from Robertsganj, and hundred meters from Veer Lorik Stone, on Markundi Hill. Eco Point Robertsganj was inaugurated on 11 August 2003 by the District Magistrate of Sonbhadra. The place is thronged by tourists during the monsoon season as it provides a very beautiful and picturesque view of the valley, including small rainy waterfalls that mushroom during the season. A small restaurant close by provides fast food items. Son View Point is a great picnic spot for the nature lovers.

Nearby
Veer Lorik Stone
Salkhan Fossils Park

References
 http://www.easternuptourism.com/?p=6803

Tourist attractions in Sonbhadra district
Gardens in Uttar Pradesh